St Luke's Church, Langold is a parish church in the Church of England in Langold.

History

The church was built in 1928. The foundation stone reads To the glory of God. This stone was laid by Miss Mellish 25 June 1928.

It is part of a joint parish with:
St John the Evangelist's Church, Carlton in Lindrick
St Mark's Church, Oldcotes

References

Churches completed in 1928
Church of England church buildings in Nottinghamshire